Mesolia presidialis is a moth in the family Crambidae. It was described by George Hampson in 1919. It is found in Mexico.

References

Ancylolomiini
Moths described in 1919